Menan Clyde Schriewer (September 20, 1934December 30, 2013) was an American football and Canadian football end. He attended Texas, and was a three-year letterman. Schriewer led the Longhorns in receiving in his junior and senior years, and recorded a total of 42 receptions for 690 yards and four touchdowns in his career. Schriewer was drafted by the Chicago Bears of the National Football League in the first round (tenth overall) of the 1956 NFL Draft. However, Schriewer eventually joined the Canadian Football League's Toronto Argonauts, who offered Schriewer more money. With the Argonauts, Schriewer was named CFL All-Star in 1957. Schriewer joined the Saskatchewan Roughriders in 1959, but rejoined the Argos a year later. He was inducted into the Longhorns Hall of Honor in 2009. In Schriewer's honor, the Menan Schriewer Offensive Lineman of the Award was created.

Schriewer died on December 30, 2013, at the age of 79.

See also
List of Chicago Bears first-round draft picks

References

External links
 CFLapedia bio
 Texas Longhorns bio

1943 births
2013 deaths
Players of American football from Texas
Texas Longhorns football players
Chicago Bears players
Toronto Argonauts players
Saskatchewan Roughriders players